Articles (arranged alphabetically) related to Taiwan include:

0–9
.tw - 14K Triad - 51st state - 99 Ranch Market - 1895 (2008 film) - 1906 Meishan earthquake - 1935 Hsinchu-Taichung earthquake - 1969 Little League World Series - 1987 Lieyu massacre - 1992 Consensus - 1996 United States campaign finance controversy - 27 Brigade - 228 Hand-in-Hand Rally - February 28 Incident - 228 Peace Memorial Park - 2005 Pan-Blue visits to mainland China - 2009 Summer Deaflympics - 2010 Kaohsiung earthquake - 2010 Foxconn suicides - 3-19 shooting incident - 314 Taipei protest - 32 Demands - 327th Air Division - 85C Bakery Cafe - 517 Protest - 7-Eleven in Taiwan - 908 Taiwan Republic Campaign - 1999 Jiji earthquake - 99 Ranch Market

A
A City of Sadness - Aborigines of Taiwan - Academia Sinica - Acer Inc. - Aerial Battle of Taiwan-Okinawa - Aerospace Industrial Development Corporation - AIDC AT-3 - AIDC F-CK-1 Ching-kuo - Air Asia (Republic of China) - American School in Taichung - Anti-ECFA protest - Aletheia University - Alishan - Alien Resident Certificate - Apple Daily (Taiwan) - Gladys Aylward - American Chamber of Commerce in Taipei - American Institute in Taiwan - American School in Taichung - Amis people - A-mei - Ancestral home (Chinese) - Rikichi Andō - Annette Lu - Ang mo - Antelope air defence system - Anti-Communist Martyrs - Anti-Korean sentiment - Areca nut - Linda Arrigo - Asus - Atayal people - Au Revoir Taipei - Austronesian languages - Aviation Safety Council

B
Bagua Plateau - Baguashan Tunnel - Baguazhang - Bahá'í Faith in Taiwan - Bai Wanxiang - Bai Chongxi - Bajiquan - H. A. Baker - Bamboo Union - Bāng Chhun-hong - Bank of Taiwan - Banyan - Barclay, Thomas - Battle of Changhsing - Battle of Chiatung - Battle of Chiayi - Battle of Guningtou - Battle of Keelung - Battle of Penghu - Battle of Tamsui - Beer in Taiwan - Beitou Cable Car - BenQ - Big River, Big Sea — Untold Stories of 1949 - Black Bat Squadron - Black Cat Squadron - Black gold (politics) - Blue Sky with a White Sun - Robert Blust - Betel nut beauty - Bo Yang - Bopomofo - A Brighter Summer Day - Broadcasting Corporation of China - Bubble tea - Buddha's Light International Association - Buddhism in Taiwan - Bunun people - Bureau of Investigation and Statistics - Burhan Shahidi - Buxiban

C
Cafe Astoria - Cairo Declaration - Canadian Trade Office in Taipei - Caoling - Campaign at the China–Burma Border - William Campbell (missionary) - Cape Eluanbi - Cape No. 7 - Cape San Diego - Capital punishment in the Republic of China - Capitulation of Tainan (1895) - Capture of the Tuapse - Vincent Robert Capodanno -  Cemetery of Zhenghaijun - Censorship in the Republic of China - Central Cross-Island Highway - Central Daily News - Central Mint of China - Central Mountain Range - Century egg - Chai Hui-chen - Chang Ch'ün - Chang-Gu World Trade Center - Chang-hua - Changhua County - Chungyuan Standard Time - Chang Dai-chien - Chang Dsu Yao - Chang Fei - John Chang - Morris Chang - Shan Leong (Sam) Chang - Chang Yi-chieh - Chaotian Temple - Gary Chaw - Chen (surname) - Chen Cheng-po - Chen Chi-li - Chen Daqi - Chen Di - Chen Yi (Kuomintang) - Chen Shui-bian - Chen Shui-bian corruption charges - Steve Chen (YouTube) - Isabelle Cheng - Chen Yinke - Chengcing Lake - Cheng Man-ch'ing -  Anna Chennault - Claire Lee Chennault - Chhut-thâu-thiⁿ - CIA activities in China - Chia-i - Chianan Canal - Chianan Plain - Chiang Ching-kuo - Chiang Ching-kuo Foundation - Chiang Ching-kuo Memorial Song - Demos Chiang - Chiang Fang-liang - Chiang Kai-shek - Chiang Kai-shek Memorial Hall - Chiang Kai-shek Memorial Song - Chiang Kai-shek statues - Chiang Wei-kuo - Chiayi County - Chien-Cheng Circle - Chilung Volcano Group - Chi Mei Museum - Chimei Innolux Corporation - Chin Pao San - China Airlines - China Airlines Flight 676 - China Daily News (Taiwan) - China Life Insurance Company (Taiwan) - China Old Veterans Unification Party - China Post - China Shipbuilding Corporation - China Times - China Women's Federation - China Youth Corps - Chinatrust Commercial Bank - Chinese Baptist Convention - Chinese Consulate-General, Taihoku - Chinese Cultural Renaissance - Chinese Culture University - Chinese Culture and Movie Center - Chinese knotting - China Motor Corporation - Chinese Encyclopedia - Chinese Muslim Association - Chinese National Federation of Industries - Chinese numerals - Chinese pangolin - Chinese punctuation - Chinese unification - Chinese Taipei - Chinese Taipei at the Olympics - Chinese Taipei Chess Association - Chinese Taipei Ice Hockey League - Chinese Taipei Olympic Committee - Chinese white dolphin - Ching Cheong - Ching Chuan Kang Air Base - Chinglish - Chingshui Cliff - Chingwin Publishing Group - Chi-lung - Chu Bong-Foo - Chu CJC-3 - Lucifer Chu -  Chu Ke-liang - Chu Mei-feng - Chun-Ming Kao - Chung Cheng Aviation Museum - Chung-Hua Institution for Economic Research - Chung Tai Shan - Chunghwa Post - Chunghwa Postal Museum - Christianity in Taiwan - Chung Hwa Travel Service - Chung-Shan Building - Chungshan Institute of Science and Technology - Chung Shyang II UAV - CIH (computer virus) - Cihou Fort - Cihu Mausoleum - Cijin–Gushan Ferry - Cinema of Taiwan - Cinnamomum camphora - Civic Blvd Expressway - Civil Air Transport - Civil Aeronautics Administration (Republic of China) - Jay Chou - Chou Meng-tieh - Chu Mei-feng - Ray S. Cline - Cloud Gate Dance Theater - CM-32 Armoured Vehicle - Coast Guard Administration (Taiwan) - John G. Coburn - Coca-Cola Museum - Jerome A. Cohen - Computex Taipei - Congressional Taiwan Caucus - Conscription in the Republic of China - Constitution of the Republic of China - Consumer Protection Commission (Taiwan) - Continental Engineering Corporation - Comfort women - communications in Taiwan - Compassion International (Taiwan) - Control Yuan - Core Pacific City - Corporal punishment in Taiwan - Council of Indigenous Peoples - County (Taiwan) - CPC Corporation, Taiwan - Cross-strait charter - Cross-Strait relations - Crystal Boys - Cultural history of Taiwan - Culture of Taiwan - C. Y. Lee

D
Dachen Islands - Dadu Plateau - Dakeng - Dalongdong - Dalongdong Baoan Temple - D-Link - Dadan Island - Daily Air - Douglas Darby - Dayi method - Debate on traditional and simplified Chinese characters - Deinagkistrodon - Desinicization - Democratic Progressive Party - Democratic Progressive Party presidential primary, 2012 - Demographics of Taiwan - Dharma Drum Mountain - Difang and Igay Duana - DigiTimes - Din Tai Fung - Diplomatic missions of Taiwan - District Courts (Republic of China) - Dominican International School - Dongchu - Douliu - Double-Heart of Stacked Stones - Double Ninth Festival - Double Ten Day - Christopher Doyle - Dragon boat - Dragon and Tiger Pagodas - Driving licence in Taiwan - Duanwu Festival - Jerome Xavier DuBois - Jacques Duchesne - Dunhua Road - Dutch Formosa - Dutch pacification campaign on Formosa

E
East Asian rainy season - East Asian Tigers - EasyCard - Eat Drink Man Woman - Economic Cooperation Framework Agreement - ECFA Debate - economy of Taiwan - education in Taiwan - Eight Views of Taiwan - Engineering education in Taiwan - Enjo kōsai - Ephraim Einhorn - elections in the Republic of China - endemic species of Taiwan - Engineering education in Taiwan - Episcopal Diocese of Taiwan - Erenlai - Eslite Bookstore - Eternal Spring Shrine - EVA Air - Evergreen Marine - Examination Yuan - Executive Yuan - Exit & Entry Permit (Republic of China) - Exploding whale

F
John K. Fairbank - FamilyMart - Thome H. Fang - Far Eastern Air Transport Flight 103 - Far East Squadron - February 28 Incident - Feitsui Dam - Harvey Feldman - Fifth Chen-Chiang summit - Fight and Smile - First Taiwan Strait Crisis - Flag of the Republic of China - Fo Guang Shan - Foot binding - Ford Lio Ho - Foreign relations of the Republic of China - Former American Consulate in Taipei - Former British Consulate at Takao - Formosa Aboriginal Culture Village - Formosa Betrayed (1965 book) - Formosa Betrayed (film) - Formosa bond - Formosa Magazine - Formosa Resolution of 1955 - Formosa Aboriginal Dance Troupe - Formosan black bear - Formosan blue magpie - Formosan League for Reemancipation - Formosan Mountain Dog - Formosan rock macaque - Formosa Plastics - Formosa Plastics Group Museum - Formosat-2 - Fort Provintia - Fort Zeelandia (Taiwan) - Forumosa - Four Noes and One Without - Four Seas - Foxconn - Free area of the Republic of China - Free China Journal - Freedom of religion in Taiwan - Fu Hsing Kang College - Fuk'anggan - Fu Sinian - Fujian White Crane - Fukan literary supplement -  Fulong Beach - Elmer Fung - Fuxing Broadcasting Station - Fuxing Road (Taipei)

G
Gangtai - Gao Yisheng - Garmin - Gender Equity Education Act (Taiwan) - General English Proficiency Test - General Order No. 1 - General Tso's chicken - Genie Chuo - Kodama Gentarō - Geography of Taiwan - George Candidius - George Leslie Mackay - Ghost Festival - Ghost marriage (Chinese) - Giant Bicycles - Herbert Giles - Glove puppetry - Golden Horse Film Festival and Awards - Golden Plaza - Gong (title) - Terry Gou - Government Information Office - Governor-General of Taiwan - Grand Hotel (Taipei) - Grand Hyatt Taipei - Gre Tai Securities Market - Greater East Asia Co-Prosperity Sphere - Green Island, Taiwan - Green Party (Taiwan) - Green Party Taiwan - Gu Zhutong - Guandu Bridge - Guangfu Road - Guandu Temple - Guang Hua Digital Plaza - Guanziling Hot Spring - Guesthouses of Chiang Kai-shek - Guidelines for National Unification - Guishan Island (Yilan) - Guling Street Avant-garde Theatre - Guo Huaiyi Rebellion - Gwoyeu Romatzyh

H
Hai Lung class submarine - Hakka - Antonius Hambroek - Hamasing - Hanjian - Gilbertus Happart - Hau Lung-pin - Hau Pei-tsun - He Yingqin - Healthcare in Taiwan - Hengchun Airport - Heng Shan Military Command Center - Hess Educational Organization - HeySong Corporation - Hierodula patellifera - High Aim 6 - Highway system in Taiwan - Histiophryne - History of education in Taiwan - History of the Kuomintang cultural policy - History of Taiwan - History of the Jews in Taiwan - HIV/AIDS in Taiwan - Hobe Fort - Hohak Band - Holidays in the Republic of China - Hokkien culture - Hoklo people - Roger Holeindre - Holy Rosary Cathedral, Kaohsiung - Masaharu Homma - Honda Taiwan - Honeymoon Bay, Yilan - Hongmen - Hsiao Bi-khim - Frank Hsieh - Janet Hsieh - Evonne Hsu - Hsu Hung-Chi - Hsin-chu - Hsin Pei - Hsing Yun - Hsinchu Air Base - Hsinchu American School - Hsinchu Campaign - Hsinchu County - Hsinchu International School - Hsinchu Science and Industrial Park - Hsiung Feng I - Hsiung Feng II - Hsiung Feng IIE - Hsiung Feng III - Hsuehshan Tunnel - Hukou Incident - Hukou system - Jason Hu - Hu Lien - Hu Kexian - Hu Na - Hu Shih - Hua-lien - Hualien Airport - Hualien County - I Hua Huang - Huang Sheng Shyan - Huang Shihui - Hui (secret society) - Human rights in Taiwan - Human trafficking in Taiwan - Hung I-Hsiang - Jon Huntsman, Jr. - Hwang Yau-tai - Paul Hyer

I
I-Kuan Tao - I-lan - Ilha Formosa: Requiem for Formosa's Martyrs - Indians in Taiwan - Industrial Technology Research Institute - Nita Ing - Interchange Association, Japan - Intercollegiate Taiwanese American Students Association - International Chinese Language Program - International Community Radio Taipei - International Dunhuang Project - Intersex rights in Taiwan - Islam in Taiwan - Iron rice bowl - Iron vote - Irredentism - ISO 3166-2:TW

J
Jadeite Cabbage - Janez Janež - Japanese invasion of Taiwan (1895) - Japanese opium policy in Taiwan (1895–1945) - Japanese Prison Camps in Taiwan during World War II - Japanization - Jhiben Hot Spring - Jiang (rank) - Jianguo Road (Taipei) - Jiao Lung Waterfall - Jinguashi - Jiu Manzhou Dang - Jiufen - Joy English School - Judicial Yuan - Junghua Dam - Robert Junius

K
Kagi Shrine - Kaohsiung - Kaohsiung American School - Kaohsiung Astronomical Museum - Kaohsiung County - Kaohsiung Cultural Center - Kaohsiung Fisherman's Wharf - Kaohsiung Grand Hotel - Kaohsiung Hakka Cultural Museum - Kaohsiung Incident - Kaohsiung International Airport - Kaohsiung Mass Rapid Transit - Kaohsiung Museum of Fine Arts - Kaohsiung Museum of History - Kaoliang wine - David E. Kaplan (author) - Karenkō Shrine - Kashmir Princess - Katsura Taro - Keelung - Keelung Campaign - Keelung Islet - Keelung Road - Kempeitai - Kenting National Park - George H. Kerr - Ketagalan Boulevard - Donald Keyser - Cynthia Khan - Yulbars Khan - Kingdom of Tungning - Kinmen - Kinmen Knife - Kinmen Airport - Ko Bunyu - Jin Au Kong - Koo Chen-fu - Koo Hsien-jung - V.K. Wellington Koo - Koreans in Taiwan - Koxinga - Koxinga Ancestral Shrine - Kuang Hua VI class missile boat - Kuomintang - Kuomintang Islamic insurgency in China (1950–1958) - Kuomintang Youth League - Kung Feng Multiple Launch Rocket System - Kung Te-cheng - Kung Tsui-chang - Kuso - Kymco

L
Lāi-goā-kho Khàn-hō͘-ha̍k - Barry Lam - Lamay Island - Lamey Island Massacre - Languages of Taiwan - Language Policy in Taiwan's White Terror - Rod Langway - Laowai - Law in Taiwan - Lawrence Lau - Homer Lea - Lothar Ledderose - Ang Lee - Henry Lee (forensic scientist) -  Lee Ta-hai - Lee Teng-hui - Wen Ho Lee - Witness Lee - Lee Yuan-tseh - Charles Le Gendre - Legislative Yuan - Leofoo Village Theme Park - Sébastien Lespès - LGBT rights in Taiwan - Li Ao - Li Mi (ROC general) - Liang Shih-chiu - Liberalism in Taiwan - Liberty Square (Taipei) - Liberty Times - Libra Radio - Lian Heng - Liang Tsai-Ping - Lien Chan - Matthew Lien - Sean Lien - James R. Lilley - Lin (surname) - Lin Ben Yuan Family - Lin Hwai-min - Lin Wang - Justin Yifu Lin - Lin Yü-chih - Lin Yutang - Lion dance - List of airlines of Taiwan - List of archaeological sites in Taiwan -List of assets owned by the Kuomintang - List of banks in Taiwan - List of Chinese language schools in Taiwan - List of Chinese Taipei Representatives to APEC - List of Cold War pilot defections - List of companies of Taiwan - List of earthquakes in Taiwan - List of Legislative Yuan elections - List of museums in Taiwan - List of national parks in Taiwan - List of national scenic areas in Taiwan - List of night markets in Taiwan - List of political parties in Taiwan - List of postal codes in the Republic of China - List of power stations in Taiwan - List of protected species in Taiwan - List of rivers in Taiwan - List of rulers of Taiwan - List of Shinto shrines in Taiwan - List of sister cities of Taipei - List of Taiwanese authors - List of Taiwanese automakers - List of Taiwanese people by net worth - List of Taiwanese submissions for the Academy Award for Best Foreign Language Film - List of Taiwanese television series - List of tourist attractions in Taipei - List of tourist attractions in Taiwan - List of universities in Taiwan - List of US arms sales to Taiwan - List of volcanoes in Taiwan - List of mountains in Taiwan - Little Taipei - Little Taiwan - Henry Liu - Liu Liankun - Lucy Liu - Liu Mingchuan - Liu Pang-yu - Liu Sung-pan - Liu Yuzhang - Liugongjun - Liuli Gongfang - Wayne Lo - Lobsang Pelden Tenpe Dronme - Longgang Mosque - Longtan Lake - Lord of Universe Church - Losheng Sanatorium - Lottery poetry - Lotus Lake - Love Boat (study tour) - Love River - Lu Sheng-yen - Luce Memorial Chapel - Lukang - Lulin Observatory - Sihung Lung - Lung Ying-tai - Lu-Yu Tea Culture Institute - Lyudao Airport

M
Ma Bufang - Ma Buqing - Ma Chengxiang - Christine Chow Ma - Ma Ho-ling - Ma Ying-jeou - Made in Taiwan - Magong Airport - Mainlander - Mako Guard District - Manchu People in Taiwan - Mandarin Airlines - Mandarin Daily News - Mandarin Phonetic Symbols II - Mandarin Training Center - Mandopop - Manhua - Maokong - 19 March 2004 assassination attempt in Taiwan - Market Place by Jasons - Oryoku Maru - Matsu Islands - Tagawa Matsu - Mayday (Taiwanese band) - Mayor of New Taipei - Mayor of Taipei - James Laidlaw Maxwell - Mazu (goddess) - MC HotDog - Media in Taiwan - Mega International Commercial Bank - Mengjia Longshan Temple - Merida Bikes - Mexicali - Miao-li - Military Assistance Advisory Group - Military dependents' village - Military of the Republic of China - Million Voices Against Corruption, President Chen Must Go - Min Sheng Bao - Mingtan Dam - Minguo calendar - Ministry of Justice Investigation Bureau - Minsheng Road - Miramar Entertainment Park - Mitsukoshi - Mo Teh-hui - MoCA Taipei - Modern History of Taiwanese in 400 Years - Modern Literal Taiwanese - Monga (film) - Mongolian barbecue - Mongolians in Taiwan - Mongolian and Tibetan Affairs Commission - Mongolian and Tibetan Cultural Center - Monopoly Bureau - Morrison Academy - Akashi Motojiro - Mr. Brown Coffee - MTV Mandarin - Mudan Incident of 1871 - Murder of Wong Chinan - Museum of World Religions - Music of Taiwan - MV Maersk Alabama

N
Teruo Nakamura - Names of Sun Yat-sen - Naming customs of Taiwanese aborigines - Nan-t'ou - Nanhai Academy - Nan Huai-Chin - Nanjing Road (Taipei) - Nanshin-ron - National Anthem of the Republic of China - National Assembly of the Republic of China - National Banner Song - National Central Library - National Center for Traditional Art - National Communications Commission - National Defense Medical Center - National Development Initiatives Institute - National Dong Hwa University (NDHU) - National Dong Hwa University Chinese Language Center (CLC) - National Education Radio - National Fire Agency - National Health Research Institutes - National Identification Card (Republic of China) - National Institute for Compilation and Translation - National Languages Committee - National Museum of History - National Museum of Marine Biology and Aquarium - National Museum of Natural Science - National Museum of Taiwan Literature - National Palace Museum - National Police Agency (Republic of China) - National Research Institute of Chinese Medicine - National Resources Commission - National Security Bureau - National Space Organization (Republic of China) - National Socialism Association - National Sun Yat-sen University - National symbols of the Republic of China - National Symphony Orchestra (Taiwan) - National Revolutionary Martyrs' Shrine - National Science and Technology Museum - National Taiwan Library - National Theater and Concert Hall, Taipei - National Unification Council - A New Partnership Between the Indigenous Peoples and the Government of Taiwan - New Party (Republic of China) - New Taipei - New Taipei City Yingge Ceramics Museum - New Taiwan dollar - New Taiwanese Literature - New Ten Major Construction Projects - Next Media Animation - Niaosung Culture - Night markets in Taiwan - Nung Chan

O
Ōgon Shrine - Oil-paper umbrella - Okinotorishima - Old City of Zuoying - Old Taiwan dollar - One-China policy - One Country on Each Side - One Town One Product (Republic of China) - Oolong - Orchid Island - Orthodoxy in Taiwan - Otōemon Hiroeda - Outline of Taiwan - Ouyang Tzu - Overseas Compatriot Affairs Commission - Oyster omelette

P
Pacific American School - Pacific Corporation - Page One (bookstore) - Pan-Blue coalition - Pan-Green Coalition - Pan Jin-yu - Danny Pang (financier) - Pai Hsien-yung - Pas-ta'ai - Pe̍h-ōe-jī - Peasant Party (Taiwan) - Peking Opera School - Peng Ming-min - Peng Wan-ru - Penghu - Pengjia Islet - People First Party - Period of mobilization for the suppression of Communist rebellion - Matthew C. Perry - Pescadores Campaign (1895) - Photography of Taiwan - P'ing-tung - Pinyin - Pirate radio in Asia - Political divisions of Taiwan (1895-1945) - Administrative divisions of the Republic of China - Political commissar - Political status of Taiwan - Political warfare - Politics of the Republic of China - Popiah - Port of Kaohsiung - Port of Keelung - Port of Taichung - Port of Taipei - Postal codes in Taiwan - Postage stamps and postal history of Taiwan - Pou Chen Corporation - Pratas Island - Prehistory of Taiwan - Presbyterian Church in Taiwan - Presidential Office Building, Taipei - President of the Republic of China - Princess Taiping (sailing vessel) - Project National Glory - Propaganda in the Republic of China - Proposed flag of Taiwan - Prostitution in Taiwan - Providence University - PTT Bulletin Board System - Public holidays in the Republic of China - Public Television Service - Puru (artist) - Pushing Hands (film)

Q
Qiandao Lake Incident - Qidong Street Japanese Houses - Qingming Festival - Qixingyan (Taiwan) - Quemoy - Quemoy Battles

R
Radio Taiwan International - Raid on Taipei - Rail transport in Taiwan - Raohe Street Night Market - Realtek - Red Cross Society of the Republic of China - Red Envelope Club - Red House Theater - Reeves's muntjac - Daniel Reid - Religion in Taiwan - Remains of Taipei prison walls - Renai Road - Renaming of Chiang Kai-shek Memorial Hall - Rennie's Mill - Republic of Taiwan→Taiwan independence - Republic of China→Taiwan - Republic of China–Holy See relations - Republic of China and weapons of mass destruction - Republic of China Armed Forces - Republic of China Armed Forces Museum - Republic of China Army rank insignia - Republic of China Marine Corps - Republic of China Military Academy - Republic of China Military Police - Republic of China on Taiwan - Republic of China passport - Republic of China Presidential Museum - 2008 Republic of China United Nations membership referendums - Republic of Formosa - Resolution on Taiwan's Future - Retrocession Day - Return to Innocence - Revolt of the Three Feudatories - ROC consumer voucher - 1996 ROC presidential election - 2000 ROC presidential election - 2004 ROC presidential election - 2004 ROC referendum - Roman Catholicism in Taiwan - Romanization of Chinese in the Republic of China - Rover incident - J. Stapleton Roy - Rukai people

S
Sakizaya people - Sakuma Samata - san zhi xiao zhu - Sanmao (author) - Sansiantai - Santikhiri - Sanzhi UFO houses - Sayon's Bell - Scouting in the Republic of China - Second Taiwan Strait Crisis - Senkaku Islands - Seven Seas Residence - Shadow play - Therese Shaheen - Sharp Daily - James Shen - Sheng Shicai - Shifen waterfall - Shihsanhang Museum of Archaeology - Shi Lang - Shilin Official Residence - Shimen Dam - Shim-pua marriage - Shin Kong Life Tower - Shinchiku Prefecture - Gotō Shinpei - Shinto in Taiwan - Shoushan - Shr-Hwa International Tower - Shuangsi Tropical Viviparous Forest - Siaolin Village - Sinckan Manuscripts - Singapore Airlines Flight 006 - Sinking of the Chian-der 3 - Sino-American Mutual Defense Treaty - Sinocentrism - Sinophone - Six Codes - Sixth Chen-Chiang summit - Sizihwan - Shuangxi Park and Chinese Garden - Shung Ye Museum of Formosan Aborigines - Siege of Fort Zeelandia - Sino-American Mutual Defense Treaty - Sisy Chen - Six assurances - Sky Bow - Cordwainer Smith - Robert W. Smith (historian) - Smoking in Taiwan - Snake wine - Sockgate - Sogo - James Soong - Soong Mei-ling - Southern Chinese wedding - Spanish Formosa - Sport in Taiwan - Sports Affairs Council - Spring Scream - SS Bokhara - St. John's University (Taiwan) - Standard Form of National Characters - William Stanton (diplomat) - The Strait Story - Strait Talk - Straits Exchange Foundation - Strawberry generation - Stinky tofu - Su-ao Cold Spring - Su Beng - Su Tseng-chang - Suncake - Sun Fo - Sun Li-jen - Nora Sun - Sun Tianqin - Sun Yat-sen Memorial Hall (Taipei) - Sun Yat-sen stamps - Sun Yuanliang - Sun Yun-suan - Sun Moon Lake - Suling Wang - Sun Yee On - Sz'Kwa

T
T65 assault rifle - T86 assault rifle - T91 assault rifle - Ta-Chia-hsi revolt - Ta-pa-ni Incident - Tai Chao-chuen incident - Taijian - Taichung - Taichung County - Taichung Airport - Taichung Bank - Taichung Basin - Taichung City Bus - Taichung Metropolitan Area MRT System - Taichung Metropolitan Opera House - Taichung Park - Taichung Power Plant - Taihoku Air Strike - Taihoku Prefecture - Tainan City - Takasago Volunteers - Tainan County - Taipei - Taipei 101 - Taipei Adventist Preparatory Academy - Taipei American School - Taipei American School student organizations - Taipei Botanical Garden - Taipei Bridge - Taipei Broadcasting Station - Taipei Bus Station - Taipei City Hall Bus Station - Taipei Confucius Temple - Taipei Dome - Taipei Economic and Cultural Office - Taipei European School - Taipei Export-Import Bank of China - Taipei Fine Arts Museum - Taipei Grand Mosque - Taipei Guest House - Taipei International Flora Exposition - Taipei Japanese School - Taipei Language Institute - Taipei Main Station - Taipei Metro - Taipei Municipal Jianguo High School - Taipei People - Taipei Postal Office - Taipei Prison - Taipei Ricci Institute - Taipei Songshan Airport - Taipei Taiwan Temple - Taipei Times - Taipei World Trade Center - Taipei World Trade Center Nangang Exhibition Hall - Taipei Zoo - Taiping (steamer) - Taiping Island - T'ai-tung - Taitung County - Taiwan - Taiwan, China - Taiwan after World War II - Taiwan Assemblies of God - Taiwan Army of Japan - Taiwan Beer - Taiwan Capitalization Weighted Stock Index - Taiwan cession - Taiwan Church News - Taiwan Communist Party - Taiwan Compatriot Entry Permit - Taiwan Confucian Temple - Taiwan Daily - Taiwan Expedition of 1874 - Taiwan Futures Exchange  - Taiwan Garrison Command - Taiwan Grand Shrine - Taiwan gulper shark - Taiwan High Prosecutors Office - Taiwan High Speed Rail - Taiwan Holiness Church - Taiwan–Hong Kong Economic and Cultural Co-operation Council - Taiwan Independence Party - Taiwan independence - Taiwan Indigenous Television - Taiwan Is Good - Taiwan Journal - Taiwan Land Reform Museum - Taiwan Lantern Festival - Taiwan Livestock Research Institute - Taiwan Lutheran Church - Taiwan Major League - Taiwan McDonald's bombings - Taiwan Miracle - Taiwan News - Taiwan Power Company - Taiwan Pride - Taiwan Province - Taiwan professional baseball - Taiwan Public Television Service Foundation - Taiwan Railway Administration - Taiwan Relations Act - Taiwan Review - Taiwan Security Enhancement Act - Taiwan Semiconductor Manufacturing Company - Taiwan serow - Taiwan Solidarity Union - Taiwan Stock Exchange - Taiwan Strait - Taiwan Strait Tunnel Project - Taiwan Sugar Railways - Taiwan subtropical evergreen forests - Taiwan Sugar Corporation - Taiwan Taoyuan International Airport - Taiwan the Formosa - Taiwan This Month - Taiwan Times - Taiwan under Qing Dynasty rule - Taiwanization - Taiwanese aborigine - Taiwanese American - Taiwanese Communist Party - Taiwanese cuisine - Taiwanese Cultural Association - Taiwanese drama - Taiwanese hot springs - Taiwanese Hokkien - Taiwanese identity - Taiwanese kana - Taiwanese literature - Taiwanese localization movement - Taiwanese Mandarin - Taiwanese nationalism - Taiwanese opera - Taiwanese pop - Taiwanese Romanization System - Taiwanese Sign Language - Taiwanese tea culture - Taiwanese units of measurement - Taiyuan Incident - Takkyubin in Taiwan - Takao Shrine - Tamkang University Maritime Museum - Tamsui - Tamsui Fisherman's Wharf - Audrey Tang - Tang Jingsong - Tang Fei - Tangwai - Taoyuan Aerotropolis - Taoyuan City - Taoyuan District - Taoyuan Mass Rapid Transit System - Taroko National Park - Tatun Volcano Group - Tatung Company - Tayana Yachts - Tea-picking opera - TECO Electric and Machinery - Telecommunications in Taiwan - Telephone numbers in Taiwan - Television in Taiwan - Temple of Confucius, Changhua - Temples of Taichung - Ten Major Construction Projects - Ten Ren Tea - Ten thousand years - Teresa Teng - Teng Yu-hsien - Teruo Nakamura - Test of Proficiency-Huayu - Thao people - Theory of the Undetermined Status of Taiwan - Third Taiwan Strait Crisis - Three Links - Three Principles of the People - Thunder Squad - Thunderbolt-2000 - Tiandihui - Tianmu, Shilin District - Tianmu Baseball Stadium - Tiender - Tien Shan Pai - Timeline of Republic of China history - Timeline of the Republic of China's nuclear program - Tong Daning - Tongyong Pinyin - Tongzhi - Touliao Mausoleum - Traditional Chinese characters - TransAsia Airways - Transportation in Taiwan - Paulus Traudenius - Treasure Hill - Treaty of Shimonoseki - Treaty of San Francisco - Treaty of Tientsin - Tri-Service General Hospital - True Buddha School - True Jesus Church in Taiwan - Ts'ao Yung-ho - Tuan Tuan and Yuan Yuan - Tung Kuei-sen - Tuntex Sky Tower - Two Chinas - Tzu Chi - Tz'u-hui Tang

U
Uhrshawan Battery - Understanding Taiwan - Uni Air - Uniform Invoice lottery - United Daily News - United Front in Taiwan - U.S. Commercial Service in Taiwan - US-Taiwan Business Council - United Nations Security Council Resolution 87 - Uni-President Enterprises Corporation - United States beef imports in Taiwan - United States Taiwan Defense Command

V
Vehicle registration plates of the Republic of China - Veterans Affairs Commission - Vietnamese migrant brides in Taiwan - Vietnamese people in Taiwan - Visa policy of the Republic of China - Visa requirements for Republic of China citizens - Voice of Free China - Voice of Han - Vote allocation

W
Helga Jensine Waabenø - Wan Chien - Wang Dan - Wang Film Productions - Wang Hsi-ling - Wang Jin-pyng - Wang Sheng (general) - Wang Ye worship - Wang Yung-ching - Wang Xuecheng - Want Want - War Trash - The Wedding Banquet - Wellcome - Jiang Wenhao - Wei Chueh - Western Taiwan Straits Economic Zone - When Will You Return? - White Fungus (magazine) - White Terror (Republic of China) - Wild Lily student movement - Wild Strawberry student movement - Winfield Reformed Church - Robin Winkler - Wistaria Tea House - Wo Weihan - Women in Taiwan - Woo Tsin-hang - World Freedom Day - World Games 2009 - World League for Freedom and Democracy - Wretch (website) - Wu Feng Legend - Wuchih Mountain Military Cemetery - Wulai District - Wushe Incident - K. C. Wu - Wu Po-hsiung - Wu Shu-chen - Wu'erkaixi

X
Xiandai wenxue - Xiaochi - Xiaolongbao - Ximending - Xinsheng Road - Xinyi Road - Xinzhuang Baseball Stadium - Xiu Zelan - Xpat Magazine

Y
Y1C Problem - Yang Cho-cheng - Edward Yang - Yang Kui - Yang Ming Marine Transport Corporation - Yangmingshan - Yangmingshan American Military Housing - Yang Sen (1884–1977) - Yanshuei District - Yao Qisheng - Yeh Shih-tao - Yehliu - Yen Chia-kan - Kenneth Yen - Taiwanese yen - Yijiangshan Islands - Yilan County - Yilan City - Yingpu Culture - Stephen M. Young (diplomat) - Youtiao - Yu Guangzhong - Yu Shyi-kun - Yu Youren - Yuchang Tunnel - Yulon Motor - Yunlin County

Z
Zhang Binglin - Zhang Qinlin - Zhang Xueliang - Zhang Zhidong - Zheng Chenggong - Zheng Jing - Zheng Keshuang - Zhinan Temple - Zhonghua minzu - Zhongli incident - Zhongshan Hall - Zhongshan Road (Taipei) - Zhongshan Soccer Stadium - Zhongshan suit - Zhongxiao Road - Zhongxing New Village - Zhu Shugui - Zhuluo County - Zushi Temple - ZyXEL

A
Taiwan